The Stealth is a 2008 3D animation short film directed by Binoy Mathew and Sajeev Kumar and produced by WaterMelon Studios.

Plot
The Stealth is focused on a sheer surveillance and attack system where sound is sensed, identified and targeted to destroy human manifestations in a stealthy manner. It suggests certain situations that though everything appears normal on the surface, stealth operations are persisted and one will be identified by its sound.

Festival screenings
 Athens Anim Fest 2009

Technicians
Direction - Binoy Mathew & Sajeev Kumar,
Animation & Editing -  A.P. Binson & Jithin C. Shine, 
Music - Oppuz,
Production -  WaterMelon Studios

References

2008 films
Indian animated short films
2000s English-language films